Blockbuster  or Block Buster may refer to:

Blockbuster (entertainment) a term coined for an extremely successful movie, from which most other uses are derived.

Corporations
 Blockbuster (retailer), a defunct video and game rental chain
 Blockbuster (Bend, Oregon), the only remaining store of the defunct rental chain

Arts and entertainment

Comics 
 Blockbuster (DC Comics), the name of four DC Comics characters
 Blockbuster (Man-Brute), a Marvel Comics character introduced in 1970
 Blockbuster (Marauder), a Marvel Comics character introduced in 1986

Music
 Blockbuster (album), a 2012 album by Block B
 "Block Buster!", a 1973 song by Sweet
 "Blockbuster" (Enhypen song), a song by Enhypen from the 2021 album Dimension: Dilemma

Television and film
 Blockbuster (2018 film), a 2018 Netflix film
 Blockbusters (American game show), an American game show which had two separate runs in the 1980s
 Blockbusters (Australian game show), an Australian children's game show
 Blockbusters (British game show), a British television game show based upon the American game show of the same name
 Blockbuster (TV series), a 2022 Netflix series
 "Block Buster", an episode of the sitcom The King of Queens
 Block Busters, a 1944 American comedy film

Other arts and entertainment
 Blockbuster (book), a 2004 book by Tom Shone
 Block Buster (Microvision), a 1979 Microvision video game
 Blockbuster (podcast), a 2019 podcast dramatizing the friendship between movie directors George Lucas and Steven Spielberg
 Blockbuster, a wrestling move also known as a somersault neckbreaker

Military
 Blockbuster bomb, a series of WWII-era air dropped bombs large enough to demolish a city block
 "Operation Blockbuster", an Anglo-Canadian military operation in the Netherlands during World War II

Music
 Blockbuster (album), a 2012 album by Block B
 "BlockBuster", a 2019 song by Dongkiz
 "Block Buster!", a 1973 song by The Sweet
 "Blockbuster", a 1989 song by The Jesus Lizard on their debut Pure

Other
 Blockbuster (book), by Tom Shone
 Blockbuster drug, a drug generating more than $1 billion of revenue for its owner each year
 Splitting maul, or block buster, a type of axe

See also 
 Blockbuster Pavilion (disambiguation)
 
 
 Block (disambiguation)
 Blockbusting (disambiguation)